Fabrício Keiske Rodrigues Oya (born 23 July 1999), commonly known as Fabrício Oya, is a Brazilian footballer who currently plays as a midfielder for Azuriz.

Career 
Oya was included in The Guardian's "Next Generation 2016".

Personal life
Born in Brazil, Oya is of Japanese descent.

Club statistics

Notes

References

1999 births
Living people
Sportspeople from Campinas
Brazilian footballers
Brazil youth international footballers
Brazilian people of Japanese descent
Association football midfielders
Brazilian expatriate footballers
Expatriate footballers in Belarus
Campeonato Brasileiro Série B players
Sport Club Corinthians Paulista players
Esporte Clube São Bento players
Oeste Futebol Clube players
FC Torpedo-BelAZ Zhodino players
Azuriz Futebol Clube players